9 Cassiopeiae (9 Cas) is a white giant star in the constellation Cassiopeia, about 2,370 light years away.

9 Cassiopeiae is classified as an A1 type giant or bright giant.  One study noted peculiarities in the spectrum that could indicate a λ Boötis star, but other researchers have refuted this.

At an age of 25 million years, 9 Cassiopeiae has expanded away from the main sequence after exhausting its core hydrogen and now has a radius about 26 times that of the Sun.

9 Cassiopeiae has a number of faint companions listed in multiple star catalogues, but they all appear to be at different distances and none are thought to be gravitationally associated.

References

A-type bright giants
Cassiopeia (constellation)
Cassiopeiae, 09
9100
225180
000330
BD+61 2586
Lambda Boötis stars